Intercontinental Formula was an open wheel, single seater motor-racing formula introduced in 1961 as an alternative to Formula One. As its name implies it was hoped to encourage participation from the United States and Europe, but ultimately the handful of races which ran under the formula all took place in Great Britain, and only for one year.

Background
In late 1958, the CSI, the regulatory body for motor-sport, announced new regulations for Formula One, to be introduced in 1961. British F1 constructors, unhappy with the new regulations which they felt favoured manufacturers such as Ferrari and Honda, developed plans for an alternative series which was effectively a continuation of the existing F1 regulations, with the limit on engine size increased from 2.5 litres to 3 litres. Hoping to attract interest from the United States, the new formula was named Intercontinental Formula.

Although Ferrari had expressed an interest in the new formula, in 1960 they announced that they would be committing to the new F1 regulations. In addition, engine manufacturer Coventry Climax also withdrew from participation, preferring to concentrate on developing the new 1.5 litre engines. Meanwhile, of the British manufacturers, only Lotus and BRM entered official works entries.

In all, only five races were run under the formula, including a joint race with Formula One. All races were won by the Cooper T53-Climax model; two by Jack Brabham and three by Stirling Moss.

With waning interest from manufacturers, coupled with the success of the new formula, Intercontinental Formula was abandoned.

Despite their initial opposition to the new formula, British manufacturers, particularly Lotus, would eventually dominate the five years of the 1.5 litre Formula One era, winning 36 out of the 47 races and taking three of the five Constructors' Championships.

Race results

1  run in conjunction with Formula One entries

References

Formula racing series
1961 establishments
1961 disestablishments
1961 in British motorsport